Muḥammad Bin Abdellah aṣ-Ṣaffār  was a Moroccan faqih, royal scribe, and author of ar-Rihla at-Tetuania Ila ad-Diar al-Faransia, a work of rihla literature about his journey with the Moroccan mission to France in 1845.

References 

Scribes
Moroccan writers
Arabic-language writers by century
People from Tétouan